The solicitor general of the United States is the fourth-highest-ranking official in the United States Department of Justice. Elizabeth Prelogar has been serving in the role since October 28, 2021.

The United States solicitor general represents the federal government of the United States before the Supreme Court of the United States.  The solicitor general determines the legal position that the United States will take in the Supreme Court. In addition to supervising and conducting cases in which the government is a party, the Office of the Solicitor General also files amicus curiae briefs in cases in which the federal government has a significant interest. 

The Office of the Solicitor General argues on behalf of the government in virtually every case in which the United States is a party, and also argues in most of the cases in which the government has filed an amicus brief. In the federal courts of appeal, the Office of the Solicitor General reviews cases decided against the United States and determines whether the government will seek review in the Supreme Court. The solicitor general's office also reviews cases decided against the United States in the federal district courts and approves every case in which the government files an appeal.

The solicitor general of the United States is subservient to, and directly reports to, the United States Attorney General.

Composition of the Office of the Solicitor General
The solicitor general is assisted by four deputy solicitors general and seventeen assistants to the solicitor general. Three of the deputies are career attorneys in the Department of Justice. The remaining deputy is known as the "principal deputy," sometimes called the "political deputy" and, like the Solicitor General, typically leaves at the end of an administration.

The solicitor general or one of the deputies typically argues the most important cases in the Supreme Court. Other cases may be argued by one of the assistants or another government attorney. The solicitors general tend to argue six to nine cases per Supreme Court term, while deputies argue four to five cases and assistants each argue two to three cases.

Significance
The solicitor general, who has offices in the Supreme Court Building as well as the Department of Justice Headquarters, has been called the "tenth justice" as a result of the close relationship between the justices and the solicitor general (and their respective staffs of clerks and deputies). As the most frequent advocate before the Court, the Office of the Solicitor General generally argues dozens of times each term. Furthermore, when the Office of the Solicitor General endorses a petition for certiorari, review is frequently granted, which is remarkable given that only 75 to 125 of the over 7,500 petitions submitted each term are granted review by the Court.

Other than the justices themselves, the solicitor general is among the most influential and knowledgeable members of the legal community with regard to Supreme Court litigation. Six solicitors general have later served on the Supreme Court: William Howard Taft (who served as the 27th president of the United States before becoming Chief Justice of the United States), Stanley Forman Reed, Robert H. Jackson, Thurgood Marshall, and Elena Kagan. Some who have had other positions in the Office of the Solicitor General have also later been appointed to the Supreme Court. For example, Chief Justice John Roberts was the principal deputy solicitor general during the George H. W. Bush administration and Associate Justice Samuel Alito was an assistant to the solicitor general. The last former solicitor general to be successfully nominated to the court was Justice Elena Kagan. Only one former solicitor general has been nominated to the Supreme Court unsuccessfully, that being Robert Bork; however, no sitting solicitor general has ever been denied such an appointment. Eight other solicitors general have served on the United States Courts of Appeals.

Within the Justice Department, the solicitor general exerts significant influence on all appeals brought by the department. The solicitor general is the only U.S. officer that is statutorily required to be "learned in law." Whenever the DOJ wins at the trial stage and the losing party appeals, the concerned division of the DOJ responds automatically and proceeds to defend the ruling in the appellate process. However, if the DOJ is the losing party at the trial stage, an appeal can only be brought with the permission of the solicitor general. For example, should the tort division lose a jury trial in federal district court, that ruling cannot be appealed by the Appellate Office without the approval of the solicitor general.

Call for the views of the solicitor general
When determining whether to grant certiorari in a case where the federal government is not a party, the Court will sometimes request that the solicitor general weigh in, a procedure referred to as a "call for the views of the solicitor general" (CVSG). In response to a CVSG, the solicitor general will file a brief opining on whether the petition should be granted and, usually, which party should prevail.

Although the CVSG is technically an invitation, the solicitor general's office treats it as tantamount to a command. Philip Elman, who served as an attorney in the solicitor general's office and who was primary author of the federal government's brief in Brown v. Board of Education, wrote, "When the Supreme Court invites you, that's the equivalent of a royal command.  An invitation from the Supreme Court just can't be rejected."

The Court typically issues a CVSG where the justices believe that the petition is important, and may be considering granting it, but would like a legal opinion before making that decision.  Examples include where there is a federal interest involved in the case; where there is a new issue for which there is no established precedent; or where an issue has evolved, perhaps becoming more complex or affecting other issues.

Although there is usually no deadline by which the solicitor general is required to respond to a CVSG, briefs in response to the CVSG are generally filed at three times of the year: late May, allowing the petition to be considered before the Court breaks for summer recess; August, allowing the petition to go on the "summer list", to be considered at the end of recess; and December, allowing the case to be argued in the remainder of the current Supreme Court term.

The Supreme Court has also occasionally invited a state attorney general to express a view on a petition related to that state. In 2009, for the first time, the invitation was directed instead to a state solicitor general, James Ho of Texas, earning the request the nickname of "CVSG-Texas."

Traditions
Several traditions have developed since the Office of Solicitor General was established in 1870. Most obviously to spectators at oral argument before the Court, the solicitor general and his or her deputies traditionally appear in formal morning coats, although Elena Kagan, the first woman to hold the office on other than an acting basis, elected to forgo the practice.

During oral argument, the members of the Court often address the solicitor general as "General." Some legal commentators such as Michael Herz and Timothy Sandefur have disagreed with this usage, saying that "general" is a postpositive adjective (which modifies the noun "solicitor"), and is not a title itself.

Another tradition is the practice of confession of error. If the government prevailed in the lower court but the solicitor general disagrees with the result, the solicitor general may confess error, after which the Supreme Court will vacate the lower court's ruling and send the case back for reconsideration.

List of solicitors general

 Some terms overlap because the incumbent remained in office after a successor was named. The office has been vacant at times while awaiting the nomination or confirmation of a successor.

List of notable principal deputy solicitors general
Paul M. Bator – 1982 to 1983
Donald B. Ayer – June 1986 to December 1988
John Roberts – October 1989–January 1993 (became Chief Justice)
Paul Bender – 1993–1996
Seth Waxman – 1996 to November 13, 1997 (became Solicitor General)
Barbara Underwood – March 23, 1998 to June 11, 2001 (acting SG from January to June 2001)
Paul D. Clement – February 2001 to July 11, 2004 (became acting SG)
Gregory G. Garre – September 2005 - June 19, 2008 (became acting SG)
Neal Katyal – February 3, 2009 to May 17, 2010 (became acting SG)
Leondra Kruger – acting principal deputy SG named in May 17, 2010 to June 9, 2011
Neal Katyal – June 9, 2011 to August 26, 2011
Sri Srinivasan – August 26, 2011 to May 24, 2013 (became Chief Judge of D.C. Circuit)
Ian Gershengorn – September 2013 to June 25, 2016 (became Acting SG)
Noel Francisco – January 20, 2017 to March 10, 2017 (became SG)
Jeff Wall – March 10, 2017 to January 20, 2021 (became Acting SG)
Elizabeth Prelogar – January 20, 2021 - October 28, 2021 (became SG)
Brian Fletcher - October 28, 2021 - Present (became Acting SG)

Notes

References

External links

United States Solicitors General
Supreme Court of the United States people
United States Department of Justice officials